Wayne Arthurs may refer to:

 Wayne Arthurs (tennis) (born 1971), Australian tennis player
 Wayne Arthurs (politician) (born 1948), member of the Legislative Assembly of Ontario

See also
 Arthur Wayne, alias of 2019 Joker film character Arthur Fleck
 Wayne (disambiguation)
 Arthurs (disambiguation)